Age of Empires Online is a multiplayer online real-time strategy game developed by Robot Entertainment and Gas Powered Games, which released on August 16, 2011. Based upon the gameplay of the Age of Empires series, it was originally developed by Robot Entertainment, but on February 24, 2011, Gas Powered Games, took over production. The game was published by Microsoft.

The game was free-to-play—it was free for users to play, though premium content could be earned or purchased, such as access to special items and blueprints, and more quests and features.

On March 27, 2012, the game premiered on Steam after a major overhaul patch which addressed complaints of an "MMO-like grind" and many other features, along with the debut of the Celtic civilization. On June 15, 2012 the premium content system was changed to offer the option to purchase all past and future content through "Empire points" earned in game, or by purchasing the points directly with real world money.

, Microsoft ceased further development on the game. A Microsoft representative later announced on the forums that on August 22, 2013, the Games for Windows – Live Marketplace would be shut down, leaving the game only accessible by current or former players. In September 2013, it was announced that the game would remain functional until July 1, 2014 when the service would be shut down. The closure was due to the content being too expensive to maintain.

In 2017, Age of Empires Online was reestablished using Microsoft's publicly released developer-kit for the game and is now hosted on a server emulator known as Project Celeste. The game can be played for free in single-player and multiplayer mode with all online features fully enabled. In May 2019, the team announced that they are developing Microsoft's unreleased Roman civilization for play based upon all known data of the civilization before the official servers were closed. It was finalized and released on March 14, 2021. The team is presently developing the Indian civilization.

Gameplay

Age of Empires Online, like its predecessors, is a real-time based strategy videogame. The game features much of the gameplay of the series, with the addition of a massive multiplayer online game element. The player possesses a capital city for each started civilization, that continues to exist when the player is offline. Also, the game features a great quantity of new content, such as the ability to craft items with earned materials and trading with other players.

The main gameplay revolved around the player developing a civilization from its birth to its peak and fall. To assure victory, the player had to gather and preserve resources to spend on new units, buildings and more advanced technology.

Civilian units, called villagers, were used to gather resources (hunting, fishing, farming, forestry, mining etc.). Resources could be traded, and also "spent" to train units, construct buildings, and research technologies.

Units
Age of Empires Online includes five classes of military units: Infantry, archers, cavalry, siege weaponry, and naval units. All military classes are developed to maintain a balance on gameplay, and thus avoiding visible advantages between civilizations. As an example, a unit powerful against buildings can be weak against a certain kind of cavalry. Unique units are available for the Greek, Egyptian, Celts, and Persian civilizations, either from the start of the game or through advisor cards. These civilization-specific units are generally more powerful, but can still be vulnerable to certain units. The priest is a special kind of military unit that has the ability to convert enemy units to the player's civilization, and to heal allied units.

Every player has a limit to the total number of units they can create—a population limit—but may not immediately use the entire potential population. The population limit increases with the number of houses or town centers in the player's village to a maximum of 200, with each house contributing five (or ten for the Norse) and each town center contributing 20 to the limit. There are two important features for unit management: The idle villager button, which helps players identify villagers that have not been assigned a task, and the town bell, which sends all of the player's villagers into the nearest town center, fortress or tower for safety.

Buildings
The buildings in Age of Empires Online are either economic or military buildings. Buildings can research technologies and upgrades that increase economic, military or unit-based efficiency, as well as provide resources for the player. Each civilization has unique buildings, but some are common for all civilizations; the most important of these being the town center, where villagers are created, resources are stored, some technologies researched and in which the player can advance to the next age. The town center can fire arrows at enemy units within range. Other economic buildings available include the storehouse for resources, farms, docks (the dock may also produce several military ships), and houses to support a higher population.

Military buildings include unit-producing buildings such as barracks, archery ranges, stables, and fortresses, as well as defensive buildings such as walls and towers. Military buildings can perform research to improve the abilities of military units, increasing their strength, defensive capabilities, or other attributes. The fortress is a powerful defensive building which can train a variety of units, including the civilization's unique units, and fires arrows at enemy units within range. It can only be built after a player has reached the third age. There are two other important defensive buildings: Walls and towers. Walls are used to prevent access for enemy units to an enclosed area, while friendly units can traverse the walls through inserted gates. Towers are equipped with the ability to fire arrows at enemy units, or garrison friendly units for protection, and can be used in conjunction with walls in establishing defense lines. Watch posts are used for extendings the line of sight.

Capital city
The capital city is similar to the "Home city" concept implemented in Age of Empires III. The city functions as the player's home base for their civilization. It continues to exist even when the player logs out of the game, though it cannot be attacked or altered by other players. Through the capital city, the player can manage quests, improve technologies, send mail, craft items, participate in player to player trade, acquire and equip new gear for individual units, and visit other player's cities. Stores built within the city can be visited by other players and currency used for the items purchased will add to the player's funds. Unlike the home city from Age of Empires III where you can only customize the look of buildings, the capital city is completely customizable; buildings and rewards can be placed anywhere on the city map as the player chooses. Players can add buildings, rewards, houses as well as statues and bushes along with other things to decorate their capital city. "Vanity Island" exist to add new bushes and statues for the player to use to decorate their capital city. The city is also used as a gateway to other AI controlled cities within the region, where a player can visit and acquire new quests and items. The capital city also has many different buildings that the player can build. Craft schools, built from the city, produce gear and consumables for the player to use. Additionally, Microsoft released a crafting app for Windows Phone which a player can use to assist in crafting within the game.

Quests
Quests are the main PvE aspect of the game. Quests generally involve fighting and defeating the AI player. They are similar to the campaigns in previous Age of Empires games. They are completed when the objectives are met. Objectives in quests vary greatly, some quests involve defeating enemies, others involve protecting a building or unit, and some involve collecting a certain amount of resources while defending from the enemy. Quest rewards include experience points, gold, empire points, chests, and sometimes gear.  Certain quests also have a co-op option, which allows the player to do the quest with another player to help them. Certain quests also have an "elite" version, which allows for the player to gain a greater amount of rewards, but is more difficult presenting the player with a greater challenge.

The different civilizations also have different quest lines, e.g. the Celts have 80 unique quests that the other civilizations do not possess.

PvP
Player versus player, or PvP, is another aspect of the game. PvP in this game can be started in one of two ways: By using Sparta PvP to find a random match, or by using the arena in the capital city to play against a party member. Sparta PvP can be accessed by visiting the Sparta region in the world map. In Sparta PvP, there are two different types of PvP options. Standard PvP is the first option and allows the player to use star techs from their tech-tree as well as any gear and advisors that they have equipped in their capital city. This PvP option was first to be released. Champion mode PvP is the second Sparta PvP option. This is also sometimes known as ranked PvP while Standard PvP is known as unranked PvP. In this PvP option all gears, star techs and advisors are disabled and cannot be used to start the players off at an even footing. All gears equipped will provide the units with a cosmetic change but will not affect their stats like they would normally do in PvE missions.

In Sparta PvP, the player starts off with a minimal amount of resources, a few villagers and their scout. Map selection is random and cannot be chosen by either players. Champion mode PvP results will also determine your TrueSkill ranking which is used to determine a player's rank globally as well as to help find the player a match and opponents for PvP. Currently, in Sparta PvP, there is an option for 1v1 PvP and 2v2 PvP. Rewards from Sparta PvP include experience points, empire points, gold and Sparta points which can be used in the stores in Sparta for chests, gear and consumables.

PvP is also accessible through the Arena in the player's capital city. While identical to Sparta PvP in many ways, Arena PvP can differ in many ways. In Arena PvP, you can play against any human opponent in your party as well as choose the map and teams (if it is a 2v2 match) before starting the game. Arena PvP  will not affect your Sparta PvP Trueskill ranking. Finally, arena PvP also does not provide any rewards to the winning player. The August 2012 update also added a new spectator mode option for Arena PvP and the October 2012 update made Arena PvP (Standard or Champion mode) free for all players.

Civilizations
Seven civilizations are available. Premium civilizations start at level 1 and are the Greeks, Egyptians, Celts and Romans. Pro civilizations start at level 20 and are the Persians, Babylonians and the Norse. Each civilization has technologies and units that are unique to them, so that no civilization possesses all the technologies or units possible within the game.

The Indian civilization is also in development by Project Celeste. They will be another Pro civilization. Release is expected to be some time in 2022, though no date has been confirmed.

Development

Age of Empires Online, under the working title Project S, was to be the first game developed by Robot Entertainment, a company founded by 45 of the 110 former staff members of Ensemble Studios, who created the Age of Empires series. The game was officially announced on August 16, 2010. Robot was hired by Microsoft to develop the game over a 24-month period. The entire studio team focused on it as their sole project, in an effort to earn startup funds for Robot's future projects.

During early production, Age of Empires Online was originally called Age of Empires IV. The development team had noticed that many other RTS game developers had moved away from the "economic game". The team felt that Age of Empires II: The Age of Kings had blended the economic and military aspects of the game perfectly, so they decided to play test it with hindsight. They noticed that many features had been lost or changed over time. It was during this time the team decided to do an "Age of Kings style gameplay in an Age of Empires setting". The designers were surprised that fans of the series were most fond of the simpler aspects of the previous titles. Former Age of Empires II lead designer Ian M. Fischer stated, "When we started floating some of the early [AoEO] out to people other pieces fell into place – I cannot tell you how many times I have had someone email me or talk to me at a show and mention how much they loved the villagers carrying big hunks of meat in the original Age or the priest "wololo"". From that point on, one of the goals was to invoke nostalgia from fans of the series when playing the game, despite the newer and updated features.

The decision to make the game online-only was based in part on the success of Age of Empires II and the popularity of its online integration with MSN Gaming Zone. Since online player interaction through the game was made a priority by the studio, two iterations of the game had to be created; a server version and a client version. This resulted in a heavily modified version of the BANG engine used in previous games of the series, along with requiring large amounts of additional server code and infrastructure to be implemented. Excluding the tools, Age of Empires Online contains over 1.2 million lines of code.

In designing the new look for the game, Robot had six artists come together to create a new art style which would look similar to the previous games from the series, yet look more "visually appealing", "timeless", and "bright". Among the art team was Ensemble Studios' first artist Brad Crow, who had worked on every Age of Empires game produced by the studio. The team implemented several ideas to give the game an improved core visual interface over that of its predecessors such as; increasing the field of view so that the player was able to see more on the screen, a tighter user interface to allow more of the field of play to be visible, a new building design to make them encompass less screen space — while also making them look more recognizable, and giving each unit a unique look and animation making them more easily distinguishable from each other.

The music and sound for the game was developed by GL33k and veteran video game composer Chris Rickwood. In composing the music, Rickwood strove to keep it in the spirit of Stephen Rippy's and Kevin McMullan's work from the prior games of the series.

On February 24, 2011, it was announced - first via Chris Taylor's Facebook page - that Gas Powered Games had taken over development from Robot Entertainment. According to a blog post, Gas Powered Games was already working on the game behind the scenes, creating content packs and moving to take over as lead developers, which was planned for some time.  The game was released on August 16, 2011 with the Greek and Egyptian civilizations, followed by the Persians during the holiday. The Celts was postponed to March 2012, and was the first out of the four civilizations solely created from start to finish by Gas Powered Games since taking over development.

Support phase and official closure
On January 3, 2013, it was announced by AOEO Trajan (Kevin Perry) via the official community blog that Age of Empires Online had finished its development stage and was entering its support phase, and in September 2013, Microsoft Studios announced that the Age of Empires Online servers would be shut down on July 1, 2014. Producer Kevin Perry gave a presentation at the 2013 Game Developers Conference explaining the reasons for AoEO's closure and why he believed its business model ultimately failed, that being mostly due to the content being too expensive to create for the small daily active userbase.

Project Celeste 

Age of Empires Online has been republished in mid-2017 under a non-commercial license under Microsoft's "Game Content Usage Rules" by an independent group of developers and can be played for free on a server emulator known as Project Celeste with all online features fully enabled. The team uses Microsoft's publicly released development-kit to balance, fix bugs, and expand the content where Microsoft's team left off. They have released 4 midgame and 3 endgame focussed questpacks, along with the Romans.

Just prior to April Fool's Day, 2021, the Project Celeste Developers unveiled a mock plan to release 3 civilizations at once, along with a set of joke "mythic" gear, as a tribute to the original development teams doing the same with the Neanderthals announcement on an April Fool's Day 9 years prior. However, they then made announcements later that day, and then on the 2nd of May 2021 to confirm that Ancient India is coming to AOEO.

Premium content
At launch, the game offered premium content to players in the form of micro-transactions. As part of the game's launch on Steam in March 2012, prices were lowered and Steam offered all premium content and booster packs in the game for a discount through the "All in Wonder Bundle". The developers later announced that in June 2012, the previous purchasing system would be discontinued, while all past and future premium content to be purchased through "Empire points" earned through gameplay. . On June 14, 2012 the summer patch went into place removing the original purchasing system for premium content and implemented the new "Empire points" system - making the game fully free to play.

Booster packs

Booster packs allowed for the player to enjoy and experience very customizable PvE gameplay. The Defense of Crete booster pack was the first booster pack to be released for Age of Empires Online.

The Skirmish booster pack was the second booster pack to be released. The Skirmish booster pack adds allowed the player to choose every element of PvE gameplay

Vanity items
At launch, there were several vanity packs for the game, These packs provided the player with blueprints to stores that allowed the player to purchase new items to use to customize and decorate their capital city with in-game gold. In Project Celeste, all content including vanity is accessible for free, and can be worked towards by gathering Empire Points or Coin from doing any form of PvE or PvP level 40 content other than skirmish.

Reception

Age of Empires Online received mixed reviews, garnering an aggregated review score of 70 on Metacritic. Some critics praise the co-operative missions, graphics, and familiar Age of Empires gameplay. However, many critics were critical of the price of the game's premium content.

Justin Calvert of GameSpot gave the game a 6.5/10, noting the PvP matchmaking system, enemy AI, and pricing as weak points, but stated, "Age of Empires Online effectively infuses its conventional real-time strategy gameplay with massively multiplayer online-style loot and leveling mechanics." IGN gave the game a 7/10, with reviewer Nick Kolan critical of the game's best features being restricted to the premium content purchases. However, Kolan closed by saying, "For all its flaws, I can’t help but like Age of Empires Online. Caught somewhere between massively-multiplayer online role-playing game and hardcore competitive real-time strategy, Age of Empires Online delivers some of the most addictive parts of both." PC Magazine gave the game 3.5 out of 5 stars, and complimented the in-game artwork as "well done" and "nicely scalable", but felt the free to play aspect should have offered more to the player. Reviewer Matthew Murray wrote, "Age of Empires Online is highly enjoyable, and I found myself afflicted with one-more-turn-itis when a fiendish mission objective captivated (or frustrated) me. That’s not the case with every game I play—and it’s not nothing."

GameSpy reviewer Mike Sharkey panned the game in his initial review, but after the game received a major overhaul patch he later stated, "Well, AoE Online is now on Steam, and courtesy of a massive spring patch, the vast majority of the problems I had with it have been addressed." PC Gamer initially gave the game a 65/100 at launch, but later reviewed the specific DLC Celts campaign giving it a score of 90/100 and calling it, "The best free RTS gaming you'll find, the Celts bring AoEO two steps closer to greatness." PC Gamer later summarized the game's major complaints during its initial launch and noted that many of them were addressed or improved by the developers.

Age of Empires Online was the third most played Games for Windows Live title for the year 2012 based on unique users. Upon its shutdown in 2014, Age of Empires Online had its players embark on 500 million single-player quests, another 13.7 million multiplayer quests, and 2 million arena matches in its three-year history.

References

External links
  (Archive)

2011 video games
Online
Free-to-play video games
Games for Windows certified games
Inactive massively multiplayer online games
Massively multiplayer online real-time strategy games
Microsoft games
Real-time strategy video games
Robot Entertainment games
Video games developed in the United States
Video games set in antiquity
Video games using Havok
Windows games